UTF may refer to:

Computing
 Unicode Transformation Format
 UTF-1
 UTF-7
 UTF-8
 UTF-16
 UTF-32

Other uses
 U.T.F. (Undead Task Force), an American comic book title
 Underground Test Facility, used for testing and developing enhanced oil recovery technology in northern Canada
 Unión del Trabajo de Filipinas, in the Philippines